Rene Medvešek (born 21 June  1963) is a Croatian film and theatre actor and director. He was born in Velika Gorica.

He has appeared in more than 10 films and several television series. To the international audience he is probably best known for playing the role of Serbian terrorist Vlado Mirić in the 1997 action film The Peacemaker.

Medvešek was the stand-in presenter for Oliver Mlakar in the 1990 Eurovision Song Contest staged that year in Zagreb, when the latter quit over comments made about his age at the time. However Mlakar went on to present the show.

Filmography

References

External links

Croatian male film actors
Croatian male television actors
1963 births
Living people
People from Velika Gorica
Golden Arena winners
20th-century Croatian male actors